The 1979 European Ladies' Team Championship took place 4–8 July at Hermitage Golf Club in Lucan, Dublin, Republic of Ireland. It was the eleventh women's golf amateur European Ladies' Team Championship.

Venue 
The hosting club was founded in 1905 and the course, a mature parkland setting, situated 12 kilometers west of the city center of Dublin, was designed by James McKenna.

The championship course was set up with par 73.

Format 
All participating teams played two qualification rounds of stroke-play with six players, counted the five best scores for each team.

The eight best teams formed flight A, in knock-out match-play over the next three days. The teams were seeded based on their positions after the stroke-play. The first placed team was drawn to play the quarter final against the eight placed team, the second against the seventh, the third against the sixth and the fourth against the fifth. In each match between two nation teams, two 18-hole foursome games and five 18-hole single games were played. Teams were allowed to switch players during the team matches, selecting other players in to the afternoon single games after the morning foursome games. Games all square after 18 holes were declared halved, if the team match was already decided.

The six teams placed 9–14 in the qualification stroke-play formed Flight B, to play similar knock-out play to decide their final positions.

Teams 
14 nation teams contested the event. Each team consisted of six players. Austria took part for the first time.

Players in the leading teams

Other participating teams

Winners 
Four-times-champions team France won the opening 36-hole competition, with a score of 26 over par 756, three strokes ahead of team Spain. 

Individual leader in the opening 36-hole stroke-play qualifying competition was Marta Figueras-Dotti, Spain, with a score of 3-under-par 143, three strokes ahead of Julia Greenhalgh, England.

The combined team from the host nation Republic of Ireland and Northern Ireland won the championship, earning their first title, beating West Germany in the final 6–1. Team France, earned third place, finishing on the podium for the eleventh time, beating England 5–1 in the third place match. With their third place, France had finished on the podium in all eleven European Ladies' Team Championships played since its inauguration in 1959.

Results 
Qualification round

Team standings

Individual leaders

 Note: There was no official award for the lowest individual score.

Flight A

Bracket

Final games

Final standings

Sources:

See also 
 Espirito Santo Trophy – biennial world amateur team golf championship for women organized by the International Golf Federation.
 European Amateur Team Championship – European amateur team golf championship for men organised by the European Golf Association.

References

External links 
 European Golf Association: Results

European Ladies' Team Championship
Golf tournaments in Ireland
European Ladies' Team Championship
European Ladies' Team Championship
European Ladies' Team Championship